Xiwei Bridge is a bridge across the Dadu River in Wuri District, Taichung City, Taiwan. The bridge connects Taichung with Xiwei Village, a pene-exclave on the southwest bank of the river. Another bridge, known as the Xiwei Second Bridge, serves as the road's westward extension into Fenyuan Township, Changhua County.

History 
The Dadu River has historically been the boundary between Taichung and Changhua. On August 7, 1959, a major flood changed the course of the river and isolated Xiwei Village from the rest of Taichung. While there are multiple roads connecting Xiwei to Changhua County, there was no direct method for Xiwei residents to reach Taichung. 

The groundbreaking ceremony for the main bridge was held on July 30, 2014, and the bridge's construction was completed on November 21, 2016. On the Xiwei end, the road stopped at a T-intersection with the one-lane,  Qingguang Road, which led to frequent accidents as cars tried to pass each other in the narrow space. Three passing areas were built in 2017 as a temporary solution while the second bridge was under construction.

The groundbreaking ceremony for the Xiwei Second Bridge occurred on October 31, 2018, and was completed on February 6, 2021.

Design 
The road on the Wuri side is Huanzhong Road Section 8, while the Xiwei side is Huangzhong Road Section 9. The  middle section is made of two steel tied-arch spans with two cable-stayed spans on each side. Girder bridges lead up to the middle section on both sides. The bridge cost  to build.

Xiwei Second Bridge is located to the west of Xiwei Bridge, carrying two lanes of traffic over the Maoluo River. The construction cost  to build. The two bridges form a direct connection between National Freeway 3 and Provincial Highway 14.

See also 

 List of bridges in Taiwan

References 

2016 establishments in Taiwan
2021 establishments in Taiwan
Bridges completed in 2016
Bridges completed in 2021
Bridges in Taichung
Bridges in Changhua County